Roger Capron was born in Vincennes, France on September 4, 1922. Interested in drawing, he studied Applied Arts in Paris from 1939 to 1943 and worked as an art teacher in 1945. He died on November 8, 2006 leaving behind a considerable body of work that is recognized worldwide.

In 1946, Roger Capron moved to Vallauris, where he founded a ceramics workshop known as 'l`Atelier Callis', contributing to the renaissance of ceramics in Vallauris.

In 1952, Roger Capron purchased an abandoned pottery in Vallauris and opened a small ceramics factory, with 15 workers. By 1957 he had established a considerable international reputation. In 1980 his factory employed 120 people and during that same decade he reverted to making one-off pieces which were shown internationally. Following an economic crisis, the factory was closed in 1982.

Timeline
1922 Born September 4 in Vincennes
1939-1943 Studied at the École des Arts Appliqués à l'Industrie (School of Applied Arts) in Paris
1945 Professor of Drawing at the École des Arts Appliqués à l'Industrie (School of Applied Arts) in Paris
1946-1948 Foundation of 'l`Atelier Callis' in Vallauris in collaboration with Robert Picault and Jean Derval.
1952 Creation of a small factory in an old pottery factory
1968 New collaboration with Jean Derval
1970 Collaboration with Marazzi-Sassuolo
1983 Creation of the Atelier Capron
2006 Died November 8.

Prizes
1954 Gold Medal at the Milan Triennale
1955 Silver Medal at Cannes
1957 and 1958 Gold Medal at Brussels Exhibition of architectural ceramics
1968 Prix du Ministère des Affaires Culturelles
1970 Grand Prix International de la Céramique
1980 Prix Spécial de l'Architecture

Bibliography
Roger Capron, Céramiste, Staudenmeyer Éditions Norma, .
L'Âge d'or de Vallauris, A. Lajoix, Les Editions de l'Amateur, .

French ceramists
1922 births
2006 deaths
20th-century ceramists